is a 1968 Japanese film shot in Australia. It was also known as The Blazing Continent.

It was made the same year as another Japanese film shot in Australia, The Drifting Avenger.

Plot
A young artist leaves Tokyo for Australia. He falls in love with a Japanese girl living in Australia.

Release
Moeru Tairiku was released on December 14, 1968.

References

External links
Moeru Tairiku at Oz Movies

1968 films
Japanese romantic drama films
Films shot in Australia
Films directed by Shōgorō Nishimura
1960s Japanese films